The African Economic Community (AEC) is an organization of African Union states establishing grounds for mutual economic development among the majority of African states. The stated goals of the organization include the creation of free trade areas, customs unions, a single market, a central bank, and a common currency (see African Monetary Union) thus establishing an economic and monetary union.

Pillars 

Currently there are multiple regional blocs in Africa, also known as Regional Economic Communities (RECs), many of which have overlapping memberships. The RECs consist primarily of trade blocs and, in some cases, some political and military cooperation. Most of these RECs form the "pillars" of AEC, many of which also have an overlap in some of their member states. Due to this high proportion of overlap it is likely that some states with several memberships will eventually drop out of one or more RECs. Several of these pillars also contain subgroups with tighter customs and/or monetary unions of their own:

These pillars and their corresponding subgroups are as follows:

Pillar membership 

1 The UMA (Arab Maghreb Union) does not participate in the AEC so far, because of opposition by Morocco

Overlaps illustrated

Other blocs 

Other African regional blocs, not participating in the AEC framework (many of them predating AEC) are:

 Greater Arab Free Trade Area (GAFTA) (an organization of most Middle Eastern states, including those outside Africa)
 Economic Community of the Great Lakes Countries (CEPGL)
 Indian Ocean Commission (COI)
 Liptako-Gourma Authority (LGA)
 Mano River Union (MRU)

Their membership is as follows:

1 Only African GAFTA members are listed. 
GAFTA and MRU are the only blocs not currently stalled.

Goals 
The AEC founded through the Abuja Treaty, signed in 1991 and entered into force in 1994
is envisioned to be created in six stages:
 (completed in 1999) Creation of regional blocs in regions where such do not yet exist
 (completed in 2007) Strengthening of intra-REC integration and inter-REC harmonisation
 (completed in 2021) Establishing of a free trade area and customs union in each regional bloc
 (to be completed in 2023) Establishing of a continent-wide customs union (and thus also a free trade area)
 (to be completed in 2025) Establishing of a continent-wide African Common Market (ACM)
 (to be completed in 2028) Establishing of a continent-wide economic and monetary union (and thus also a currency union) and Parliament
 End of all transition periods: 2034 at the latest

Stages progress 
as of September 2007
 Stage 1: Completed, only Arab Maghreb Union members and Sahrawi Republic not participating. Somalia is participating, but no practical implementation yet.
 Stage 2: Steady progress, nothing factual to check.
 Stage 3:

1 Members not yet participating: DR Congo (in talks to join), Eritrea, Ethiopia, Seychelles (in talks to join), Swaziland (on derogation until SACU gives permission for Swaziland to join the FTA), Uganda (to join very soon)
2 Members not yet participating: Angola, DR Congo, Seychelles 
 Stage 4: In March 2018, 49 African countries signed the African Continental Free Trade Agreement paving the way for a continent-wide free trade area. The continental free trade area became operational in July 2019, after 22 ratifications. As of 2021, 34 signataries have effectively become parties of the treaty.
 Stage 5: no progress yet
 Stage 6: no progress yet

Overall progress 

1 not all members participating yet
2 telecommunications, transport and energy - proposed
3 sensitive goods to be covered from 2012

African Free Trade Zone

The African Free Trade Zone (AFTZ) was announced on Wednesday October 22, 2008 by the heads of Southern African Development Community (SADC), the Common Market for Eastern and Southern Africa (COMESA) and the East African Community (EAC).

In May 2012 the idea was extended to also include ECOWAS, ECCAS and AMU.

See also 
African Economic Outlook
Economy of Africa
Economy of the African Union

References

Sources 
A single African currency in our time?
African leaders agree to form single market
African Union Official Website
South African webpage on RECs
Pan-African Perspective

African Union
Economy of the African Union
Regional Economic Communities of the African Union
Special economic zones
Trade blocs
1991 in economics